James A. Calhoun (born May 10, 1942) is a longtime college basketball coach. He is best known for his tenure as head coach of the University of Connecticut (UConn) men's basketball team. His teams won three NCAA national championships (1999, 2004, 2011), played in four Final Fours, won the 1988 NIT title, and won seven Big East tournament championships (1990, 1996, 1998, 1999, 2002, 2004, 2011). With his team's 2011 NCAA title win, the 68-year-old Calhoun became the oldest coach to win a Division I men's basketball title. He won his 800th game in 2009 and finished his NCAA Division I career with 873 victories, ranking 11th all-time as of February 2019. From 2018–21, he served as head coach of the University of Saint Joseph men's basketball team. Calhoun is one of only six coaches in NCAA Division I history to win three or more championships, and he is widely considered one of the greatest coaches of all time. In 2005, he was inducted into the Basketball Hall of Fame.

Early life and education
A self-described Irish Catholic, Calhoun was born and raised in Braintree, Massachusetts, where he was a standout on the basketball, football, and baseball teams at Braintree High School. After his father died of a heart attack when Calhoun was 15, he was left to watch over his large family that included five siblings.

Although he received a basketball scholarship to Lowell State, he only attended the school for three months after which he returned home to help support his mother and siblings. He worked as a granite cutter, headstone engraver, scrapyard worker, shampoo factory worker, and gravedigger.

After a 20-month leave from higher education, Calhoun returned to college, this time at American International College in Springfield, Massachusetts, where he was given another basketball scholarship. He was the leading scorer on the team his junior and senior seasons, and captained the team in his final year, during which AIC advanced to the Division II playoffs. At the time he graduated, he was ranked as the fourth all-time scorer at AIC. Calhoun graduated in 1968 with a bachelor's degree in sociology.

Coaching career

High school
Calhoun began his coaching career at Lyme-Old Lyme High School in Old Lyme, Connecticut in the 1968–69 season after accepting a sixth grade teaching position in that town over the summer. After finishing 1–17 that season, Calhoun returned to Massachusetts after deciding not to complete the necessary certification paperwork to renew his teaching contract (he was certified in Massachusetts and working in Conn. only on a temporary certificate). After one season at Westport (Massachusetts) High, he accepted a position at Dedham High School and began building a very strong program. He completed a 20–1 season in 1971.

In 1972 he helped his Dedham High School team have a perfect season (18–0) and win the Massachusetts High School Bay State Championship.

Northeastern
Calhoun was recruited by Northeastern University in Boston to serve as their new head coach. He took the position in October 1972. He transitioned the team from Division II to Division I in 1979.

The Huskies advanced to the Division I tournament 4 times under Calhoun. During his final three seasons, Northeastern achieved automatic bids to the NCAA tournament and had a 72–19 record. He received six regional Coach of the Year accolades at Northeastern and remains the institution's all-time winningest coach (245–138).

Former Boston Celtics captain Reggie Lewis, who played for Calhoun at Northeastern, was a first-round pick in the 1987 NBA draft.

UConn
On May 14, 1986, Calhoun was named the head coach at UConn. After completing his first season just 9–19, Calhoun led the Huskies to a 20–14 record in 1988 and a bid to National Invitation Tournament, where they defeated Ohio State to win the NIT championship. In 1990, Calhoun was named the consensus National Coach of the Year after leading the Huskies to their first Big East Conference championship, the NCAA tournament Elite Eight, and a 29–6 record in only his fourth year at the helm.

Calhoun won his first NCAA national championship in 1999, as he led UConn to its first Final Four and national championship over  favored Duke in St. Petersburg, Florida. Future NBA standout Richard "Rip" Hamilton led the team to a 77–74 victory.  Earlier that year, Calhoun had passed Hugh Greer to become the winningest coach in UConn history.

Calhoun led the Huskies to another national championship in 2004, at the conclusion of a season that saw UConn start and complete the year as the number one team in the nation. UConn standouts Emeka Okafor and Ben Gordon were selected No. 2 and No. 3 in the NBA draft, respectively. Calhoun now holds a 35–12 record with UConn in NCAA tournament play including 6–1 in the Final Four. They lost in the first round for the first time on March 21, 2008 in overtime to San Diego.

During the Jim Calhoun era, the Huskies did well in the Big East Conference with an impressive 220–112 record (.665 winning percentage). The Huskies won or shared conference titles in 1990, 1994–1996, 1998–1999, 2002, 2003 and 2005–2006. UConn also won seven Big East men's basketball tournament championships in 1990, 1996, 1998, 1999, 2002, 2004, and 2011.

On March 2, 2005, he achieved his 700th win at Gampel Pavilion over the Georgetown Hoyas. His friend and Big East rival coach Jim Boeheim also won his 700th game during the previous week. Later in 2005, Coach Calhoun was honored by induction into the Naismith Memorial Basketball Hall of Fame, fittingly, along with Boeheim. On February 25, 2009, he achieved his 800th win at the Bradley Center over Marquette.

Calhoun was the first coach in NCAA history to have won at least 240 games at two different Division I schools. Eddie Sutton later achieved this same feat.

Calhoun also coached 23 UConn players who have moved on to professional ranks.

Calhoun signed a five-year, $16 million contract until 2014.

On April 4, 2011, Calhoun won his third NCAA title as the Huskies defeated Butler 53–41. The victory over Butler made Calhoun, at 68, the oldest coach to win an NCAA Division I men's basketball title. With the win, Calhoun joined John Wooden, Adolph Rupp, Bob Knight, and Mike Krzyzewski as the only coaches to win at least 3 national championships.

On September 13, 2012, Calhoun announced his retirement and the head coaching position was given to assistant coach Kevin Ollie, who eventually was named the permanent head coach.

Sanctions
In March 2009, the NCAA investigated potential violations in UConn's recruitment of Nate Miles (a scholarship recipient expelled without playing a single game for the Huskies).  The NCAA eventually determined that a former UConn team manager, who was attempting to become an NBA agent, helped guide Miles to UConn by giving him lodging, transportation and meals.  The former team manager, Josh Nochimson, was deemed a UConn representative under NCAA rules and his actions were therefore ascribed to UConn.  As a result, in February 2011, Calhoun was cited by the NCAA for failing to create an atmosphere of compliance, and suspended for the first three Big East games of 2011–2012 season.  The NCAA's chairman of the Committee on Infractions stated, after the penalty was announced, that "[t]he head coach should be aware, but, also in the same frame, the head coach obviously cannot be aware of everything that goes on within the program. However, the head coach bears that responsibility." The school admitted that it had committed major NCAA violations.

Health problems
On February 3, 2003, Calhoun announced that he had been diagnosed with prostate cancer. He took an immediate leave of absence from the team, and underwent surgery three days later to have his prostate removed. He was released from the hospital on February 9 and within days was once again involved in the day-to-day operation of the program. On February 22 Jim Calhoun returned to the sidelines for the team's matchup with St. John's at Gampel Pavilion, only 16 days after the surgery.

On May 30, 2008, UConn announced that Calhoun was undergoing treatment for squamous cell carcinoma.

On June 13, 2009, Calhoun fell during a charity bike event and broke five ribs.

On January 19, 2010, Calhoun took a leave of absence from the team again due to health reasons.  Calhoun had a "serious" condition that he wanted to discuss with his family. Calhoun returned to the court to coach the Huskies on February 13.

On February 3, 2012, Calhoun took a medical leave of absence from coaching as a result of spinal stenosis. He returned on March 3, 2012, less than a week after having back surgery, to coach the team to a win over Pittsburgh in the final game of the regular season.

After a left hip fracture he received while bike riding on August 4, 2012, Calhoun had surgery that same day.

Retirement
Calhoun retired as Connecticut's basketball coach on September 13, 2012, closing a 26-year career at UConn.

Comeback in Division III
On September 18, 2018, Calhoun was named the first head coach of the men's basketball team at the University of Saint Joseph (USJ), an NCAA Division III program in West Hartford, Connecticut. He told the school website: "Whether it's Division I or Division III, the kids are the kids and the game is the game and I'm looking forward to getting back out on the court and teaching these young men each and every day. I really missed being a part of a team." Glen Miller became his assistant at USJ. Calhoun's 2019–20 team at USJ had a 25-game winning streak before losing in the first round of the Division III postseason tournament.

On November 18, 2021, Calhoun announced he would step down as Head Coach at St. Joseph, effective immediately.

Personal life
Calhoun and his wife, Pat, live in Pomfret, Connecticut, have been married since 1967, and have two sons and six grandchildren. They previously also had a home on Long Island Sound in Madison, Connecticut and sold it in 2016.

The couple, both of whom lost parents to heart disease, are known for their philanthropy, including the Pat and Jim Calhoun Cardiology Center at UConn and the annual Jim Calhoun Holiday Food Drive which has raised nearly $1 million supporting food assistance agencies that serve to help families in need throughout the State of Connecticut. In 1998, a $125,000 gift from Jim Calhoun and his wife Pat established the Jim and Pat Calhoun Cardiology Research Fund at UConn Health Center. The Jim Calhoun Celebrity Classic Golf Tournament was launched in 1999 and has since raised millions in support of the endowment fund. In 2003 & 2004, Coach Calhoun served as celebrity host of the black tie gala "Hoops For Hope", by Coaches vs. Cancer, a program established in 1993 by the American Cancer Society; the events raised over $400,000 for the ACS.  2007 is the first year of The Big Y Jim Calhoun Cancer Challenge Ride statewide event to benefit The Carole and Ray Neag Comprehensive Cancer Center at the University of Connecticut Health Center; the ride raised over $225,000.

For many years Calhoun has been the Honorary Chairman of the Juvenile Diabetes Foundation, which has generated over $4.5 million to fund diabetes research. Coach Calhoun has also served as an Honorary Chairperson/Director for other charitable programs including the Ronald McDonald House Kids Classic Golf Tournament, the Ray of Hope Foundation Golf Tournament, the Connecticut Children's Medical Center and Children's Miracle Network, and the "Character Counts" program in the state of Connecticut. During his coaching years, Calhoun wore an Autism Speaks pin on his suit and has supported the foundation for many years.

Awards and honors
1998 – The Franciscan Sisters dedicate an outdoor basketball area, "Calhoun's Court" at the Franciscan Life Center in Meriden, Connecticut
2004 – Calhoun is the first recipient of an award by the Swim Across The Sound Prostate Cancer Institute
2005 – "Honorary Alumni Award" from the University of Connecticut Alumni Association
2005 – Inducted into the Basketball Hall of Fame, Springfield, MA
2019 – Received the Best Coach award at the 2019 ESPYs in Los Angeles, California

Former players
Thirty-one of Coach Calhoun's former players moved on to professional careers in the National Basketball Association, the Continental Basketball Association, or other national and international leagues:
(with draft team from earliest to most recent)
 1982: Perry Moss – Washington Bullets, Philadelphia 76ers, Golden State Warriors
 1987: Reggie Lewis – Boston Celtics 
 1989: Clifford Robinson – Portland Trail Blazers
 1990: Nadav Henefeld – Maccabi Tel Aviv
 1990: Tate George – New Jersey Nets
 1992: Chris Smith – Minnesota Timberwolves
 1993: Scott Burrell – Charlotte Hornets
 1994: Donyell Marshall – Minnesota Timberwolves
 1995: Kevin Ollie – Connecticut Pride, CBA; Dallas Mavericks, Orlando Magic, Sacramento Kings, Philadelphia 76ers, New Jersey Nets, Chicago Bulls, Indiana Pacers, Milwaukee Bucks, Seattle SuperSonics, Cleveland Cavaliers, Minnesota Timberwolves, Oklahoma City Thunder
 1995: Donny Marshall – Cleveland Cavaliers
 1996: Ray Allen – Milwaukee Bucks, Seattle SuperSonics, Boston Celtics, Miami Heat
 1996: Travis Knight – Chicago Bulls
 1996: Doron Sheffer – Los Angeles Clippers, Maccabi Tel Aviv
 1999: Richard Hamilton – Washington Wizards, Detroit Pistons, Chicago Bulls
 2000: Khalid El-Amin – Chicago Bulls
 2000: Jake Voskuhl – Phoenix Suns, Chicago Bulls, Charlotte Bobcats, Milwaukee Bucks, Toronto Raptors
 2002: Caron Butler – Miami Heat, Washington Wizards, Dallas Mavericks, Los Angeles Clippers, Milwaukee Bucks
 2004: Emeka Okafor – Charlotte Bobcats, New Orleans Hornets, Washington Wizards, Phoenix Suns
 2004: Ben Gordon – Chicago Bulls, Detroit Pistons, Charlotte Bobcats
 2005: Charlie Villanueva – Toronto Raptors, Milwaukee Bucks, Detroit Pistons
 2006: Hilton Armstrong – New Orleans Hornets
 2006: Josh Boone – New Jersey Nets
 2006: Denham Brown – Seattle SuperSonics
 2006: Rudy Gay – Houston Rockets, Memphis Grizzlies, Toronto Raptors, Sacramento Kings, San Antonio Spurs, Utah Jazz
 2006: Marcus Williams – New Jersey Nets, Golden State Warriors, Memphis Grizzlies
 2009: A. J. Price – Indiana Pacers, Washington Wizards, Minnesota Timberwolves
 2009: Hasheem Thabeet – Memphis Grizzlies, Houston Rockets, Portland Trail Blazers, Oklahoma City Thunder
 2010: Jeff Adrien – Golden State Warriors, Houston Rockets, Charlotte Bobcats
 2011: Kemba Walker – Charlotte Hornets, Boston Celtics, New York Knicks
 2012: Andre Drummond – Detroit Pistons, Cleveland Cavaliers, Los Angeles Lakers, Philadelphia 76ers
 2012: Jeremy Lamb – Houston Rockets, Oklahoma City Thunder, Charlotte Hornets, Indiana Pacers
 2014: Shabazz Napier – Miami Heat, Orlando Magic, Portland Trail Blazers

Head coaching record

College

* Connecticut had its 2–1 record in the 1996 NCAA tournament and Sweet 16 appearance vacated after two players were ruled ineligible.

As of April 5, 2013, Calhoun has a 50–19 record in the NCAA Tournament, going 2–5 (.286) at Northeastern and 48–14 at Connecticut.

Due to COVID-19 complications, the 2020–21 season was shortened and the team finished with a 3–2 record. Calhoun wasn't able to be on the sidelines for a game that year due to an injury he suffered right before the season.

See also
 List of college men's basketball coaches with 600 wins
 List of NCAA Division I Men's Final Four appearances by coach

Further reading
 Calhoun, Jim. Dare To Dream: Connecticut Basketball's Remarkable March to the National Championship 
 Calhoun, Jim. A passion to lead: seven leadership secrets for success in business, sports, and life

Notes

References

External links

 Saint Joseph profile

1942 births
Living people
American International Yellow Jackets men's basketball players
American men's basketball coaches
American men's basketball players
American people of Irish descent
Basketball coaches from Massachusetts
Basketball players from Massachusetts
Braintree High School alumni
Calhoun family
Catholics from Connecticut
College men's basketball head coaches in the United States
High school basketball coaches in Connecticut
High school basketball coaches in Massachusetts
Naismith Memorial Basketball Hall of Fame inductees
NCAA sanctions
Northeastern Huskies men's basketball coaches
People from Madison, Connecticut
People from Old Lyme, Connecticut
Saint Joseph Blue Jays men's basketball coaches
Sportspeople from Braintree, Massachusetts
UConn Huskies men's basketball coaches